Magical Universe is a 2013 documentary film directed by filmmaker Jeremy Workman about reclusive outsider artist Al Carbee who created elaborate dioramas and collages featuring Barbie dolls. The title of the film is taken from Carbee's own voluminous writings about his wondrous art.

The film grew out of Workman's short film Carbee's Barbies and encompasses the final years of Carbee's life, a period in which Workman became Carbee's closest friend and his only link to the outside world.

First presented at numerous film festivals, Magical Universe was acquired by IFC Films and released theatrically on October 31, 2014.

Synopsis
Al Carbee is a true American original. An 88-year-old recluse living in Maine, he devotes nearly all his time to creating extraordinarily elaborate works of art from Barbie dolls. This captivating documentary, filmed over the course of the director's decade-long friendship with the artist, goes inside the mind of the enigmatic Carbee to reveal his rich, wondrous, and sometimes heart-wrenching inner-life. An eye-opening portrait of an all but unknown artist and an inspiring testament to the triumph of the creative spirit, Magical Universe is a moving tribute to a one-of-a-kind visionary.

Release

After winning several film festival awards, Magical Universe was acquired by theatrical distributors IFC Films and was released in theaters on October 31, 2014. It was subsequently made available on Netflix in May 2015 as well as on the IFC Films Unlimited streaming platform on Amazon Prime.

In the summer of 2016, Magical Universe was featured at the Musée des Arts Décoratifs, Paris at the Louvre as part of their Barbie exhibit.

Critical response
On review aggregator Rotten Tomatoes, the film holds an approval rating of 63% based on 8 reviews, with an average rating of 6.12/10. In the Los Angeles Times, Michael Rechtshaffen described the film as "whimsical... affectionate...A tender portrait of the artist as a weirdly gifted, wildly prolific, and strange man" and made the film a Los Angeles Times Critics Choice.  Lauren Wissot of Filmmaker magazine suggested that the film is "crafted in a style that brings us practically inside the brain of the 88-year old outsider artist."  And during the film's national theatrical run, the Village Voice made it a Critics Pick with film critic Abby Garnett saying that Workman "captures the poignancy of Carbee's drive to create ideal images...This story is about tenderness and empathy."

Awards 
 Woodstock Film Festival, Best Documentary Audience Award (winner)
 Woodstock Film Festival, Best Documentary Jury Award (Honorable Mention)
 Salem Film Festival, Audience Award (winner)
 Las Vegas Film Festival, Special Jury Prize (winner)

References

External links 
Official Website

 Interview with director Jeremy Workman on Tribeca Film

Documentary films about visual artists
2013 documentary films
American documentary films
Documentary films about photographers
2013 films
2010s English-language films
2010s American films